TCW Group is an asset management firm based in Los Angeles, California.

History
Founded by Robert Addison Day in 1971 and headquartered in Los Angeles, TCW manages a broad range of investment products. The TCW Group was originally known as Trust Company of the West. TCW clients include many of the largest corporate and public pension plans, financial institutions, endowments and foundations in the U.S., as well as foreign investors and high-net-worth individuals.

In 2001, Société Générale (SocGen) acquired a controlling interest in The TCW Group.

On February 24, 2010, TCW announced the completion of its acquisition of Metropolitan West Asset Management LLC (MetWest), a leading fixed income investment management firm.

In February 2013, TCW management and alternative asset manager The Carlyle Group acquired TCW Group from Société Générale. As a result of the transaction, TCW management and employees increased their ownership in the firm to approximately 40% on a fully diluted basis, better aligning interests with clients.  Equity for the investment came from two Carlyle investment funds and from TCW management.

In December 2017, Nippon Life Insurance Company purchased a 25% minority stake in TCW from The Carlyle Group. As a result of the purchase, ownership by TCW management and employees increased to 44%, while Carlyle maintains a 31% interest in the firm.

As of December 31, 2022, TCW had $205 billion of assets under management or committed to management. The CEO (interim) of The TCW Group is Liz Kraninger.

References

External links
The TCW Group, Inc. website

Financial services companies established in 1971
Investment management companies of the United States
Companies based in Los Angeles
2001 mergers and acquisitions
2013 mergers and acquisitions
The Carlyle Group companies
American companies established in 1971